Sacred Heart Cathedral is a cathedral church located at 415 East Green Avenue in Gallup, New Mexico, United States.   It is the seat of the Roman Catholic Diocese of Gallup.

History
The first Sacred Heart church was built by Father George Julliard in 1899.  Part of the building collapsed in 1916 and a new structure on Hill Street between 4th and 5th Streets replaced it the following year.  When the Diocese of Gallup was established in 1939, Sacred Heart Church became its cathedral.  The present cathedral dates from 1955 and replaced the 1917 sanctuary at a cost of $500,000.  Franciscan Friars served the parish until July 1, 1981, when the first diocesan priest, the Rev. Alfred Tachias, became pastor and cathedral rector.

Gallery of pictures

See also
List of Catholic cathedrals in the United States
List of cathedrals in the United States

References

External links

Official Cathedral Site
Roman Catholic Diocese of Gallup Official Site

Roman Catholic churches completed in 1955
Roman Catholic cathedrals in New Mexico
Roman Catholic churches in New Mexico
Buildings and structures in McKinley County, New Mexico
Tourist attractions in McKinley County, New Mexico
20th-century Roman Catholic church buildings in the United States